Cyanarctia dama is a moth of the subfamily Arctiinae. It was described by Herbert Druce in 1894. It is found in Mexico and Guatemala.

References

Arctiini
Moths described in 1894